Jonas Žnidaršič (born 30 January 1962, Novo Mesto) is a Slovenian television personality and journalist. He is best known for hosting the Slovenian version of Who Wants to be a Millionaire. He is a serious poker player and has appeared on Late Night Poker in Great Britain.

References

External links
Personal website

1962 births
Living people
Slovenian game show hosts
Television people from Ljubljana
University of Ljubljana alumni
Slovenian male stage actors
Slovenian radio personalities
Slovenian television personalities
Slovenian journalists
Slovenian poker players
Slovenian bloggers
Slovenian telenovela actors
Slovenian male film actors
Slovenian guitarists
People from Novo Mesto
Male telenovela actors
Male bloggers